Linda Eshun (born 5 August 1992) is a Ghanaian footballer who plays as a defender who has played for the Ghana women's national football team since 2014. She competed at the 2014 African Women's Championship. At the club level, she played for Hasaacas Ladies in Ghana.

References

External links
Linda Eshun at BDFútbol

1992 births
Living people
People from Sekondi-Takoradi
Ghanaian women's footballers
Women's association football defenders
Hasaacas Ladies F.C. players
Segunda Federación (women) players
Ghana women's international footballers
Ghanaian expatriate women's footballers
Ghanaian expatriate sportspeople in Spain
Expatriate women's footballers in Spain